The 1967 Nova Scotia general election was held on 30 May 1967 to elect members of the 49th House of Assembly of the Province of Nova Scotia, Canada. It was won by the Progressive Conservative Party.

Results

Results by party

Results by region

Retiring incumbents
Liberal
Carleton L. MacMillan, Victoria

Progressive Conservative
George A. Burridge, Yarmouth
Paul Kinsman, Kings West
Gladys Porter, Kings North

Nominated candidates
Legend
bold denotes party leader
† denotes an incumbent who is not running for re-election or was defeated in nomination contest

Valley

|-
|bgcolor=whitesmoke|Annapolis East
||
|John I. Marshall2,86656.13%
|
|Malcolm Balcom2,24043.87%
|
|
|
| 
||
|John I. Marshall
|-
|bgcolor=whitesmoke|Annapolis West
|
|Kenneth Green1,98145.87%
||
|Peter M. Nicholson2,33854.13%
|
|
|
|
||
|Peter M. Nicholson
|-
|bgcolor=whitesmoke|Clare
|
|Hector J. Pothier1,84143.57%
||
|Benoit Comeau2,38456.43%
|
|
|
|
||
|Hector J. Pothier
|-
|bgcolor=whitesmoke|Digby
||
|Robert Baden Powell2,52451.31%
|
|Phillip R. Woolaver2,39548.69%
|
|
|
|
||
|Robert Baden Powell
|-
|bgcolor=whitesmoke|Hants West
||
|Norman T. Spence3,76551.96%
|
|Robert D. Lindsay3,48148.04%
|
|
|
|
||
|Norman T. Spence
|-
|bgcolor=whitesmoke|Kings North
||
|Victor Thorpe3,40755.25%
|
|Victor Cleyle2,75944.75%
|
|
|
|
||
|Gladys Porter†
|-
|bgcolor=whitesmoke|Kings South
||
|Edward Haliburton2,51562.89%
|
|Bruce Trenholm1,48437.11%
|
|
|
|
||
|Edward Haliburton
|-
|bgcolor=whitesmoke|Kings West
||
|Gordon Tidman3,61948.98%
|
|Frank Bezanson3,52247.67%
|
|Ralph Loomer2473.34%
|
|
||
|Paul Kinsman†
|}

South Shore

|-
|bgcolor=whitesmoke|Lunenburg Centre
||
|George O. Lohnes4,22951.46%
|
|Walton Cook3,76045.75%
|
|Earl Croft2292.79%
|
|
||
|George O. Lohnes
|-
|bgcolor=whitesmoke|Lunenburg East
||
|Maurice L. Zinck2,10055.87%
|
|Fred Porter Jr.1,65944.13%
|
|
|
|
||
|Maurice L. Zinck
|-
|bgcolor=whitesmoke|Lunenburg West
||
|Harley J. Spence2,56450.00%
|
|Carroll Young2,39646.72%
|
|Wilson Touchie1683.28%
|
|
||
|Harley J. Spence
|-
|bgcolor=whitesmoke|Queens
||
|W. S. Kennedy Jones3,29057.69%
|
|G. Cecil Day2,41342.31%
|
|
|
|
||
|W. S. Kennedy Jones
|-
|bgcolor=whitesmoke|Shelburne
||
|James McKay Harding3,27146.60%
|
|Harold Huskilson3,11144.32%
|
|Aubrey Harding6389.09%
|
|
||
|James McKay Harding
|-
|rowspan=2 bgcolor=whitesmoke|Yarmouth 
||
|Benoit Robichaud5,00326.56%
|
|Fraser Mooney4,46323.69%
|
|
|
|Willard F. Allen3291.75%
||
|George A. Burridge†
|-
||
|George A. Snow5,34528.37%
|
|Earle Maberley3,69919.63%
|
|
|
|
||
|George A. Snow
|}

Fundy-Northeast

|-
|rowspan=2 bgcolor=whitesmoke|Colchester
||
|Robert Stanfield9,09131.04%
|
|George Pulsifer5,34418.25%
|
|Arthur Benedict5071.73%
|
|
||
|Robert Stanfield
|-
||
|George Isaac Smith8,48528.97%
|
|Charles Sutherland5,34818.26%
|
|Cecil Delaney5091.74%
|
|
||
|George Isaac Smith 
|-
|bgcolor=whitesmoke|Cumberland Centre
||
|Stephen T. Pyke2,43767.34%
|
|Charles H. Sarson1,02228.24%
|
|J. Reginald Daborn1604.42%
|
|
||
|Stephen T. Pyke
|-
|bgcolor=whitesmoke|Cumberland East
||
|James A. Langille4,41555.16%
|
|Howard R. Furlong3,05338.14%
|
|John Burbine5366.70%
|
|
||
|James A. Langille
|-
|bgcolor=whitesmoke|Cumberland West
||
|D. L. George Henley2,50657.81%
|
|Ruth Fullerton1,69839.17%
|
|Shirley Spicer1313.02%
|
|
||
|D. L. George Henley
|-
|bgcolor=whitesmoke|Hants East
||
|Albert J. Ettinger2,69752.08%
|
|Norman E. Casey2,48247.92%
|
|
|
|
||
|Albert J. Ettinger
|}

Halifax/Dartmouth/Eastern Shore

|-
|bgcolor=whitesmoke|Halifax Atlantic
||
|John Buchanan4,50753.74%
|
|Percy Baker3,55642.40%
|
|Charles Grineault3243.86%
|
|
||
|New riding
|-
|bgcolor=whitesmoke|Halifax Chebucto
||
|James H. Vaughan5,15452.01%
|
|K. Peter Richard4,25342.92%
|
|Keith Jobson5035.08%
|
|
||
|James H. Vaughan Halifax North
|-
|bgcolor=whitesmoke|Halifax Citadel
||
|Donald MacKeen Smith4,77155.41%
|
|Robert Matheson3,52240.91%
|
|M. Rae Gillman3173.68%
|
|
||
|Donald MacKeen Smith Halifax Centre
|-
|bgcolor=whitesmoke|Halifax Cobequid
||
|Gordon H. Fitzgerald5,46351.51%
|
|John F. Cruickshank5,14348.49%
|
|
|
|
||
|Gordon H. Fitzgerald Halifax Northwest
|-
|bgcolor=whitesmoke|Halifax Cornwallis
||
|Richard Donahoe5,45856.39%
|
|Clarence L. Gosse4,22143.61%
|
|
|
|
||
|Richard Donahoe Halifax South
|-
|bgcolor=whitesmoke|Halifax Eastern Shore
|
|Nelson Gaetz3,68243.36%
||
|Duncan MacMillan4,20149.48%
|
|James Yetman6087.16%
|
|
||
|Nelson Gaetz Halifax East
|-
|bgcolor=whitesmoke|Halifax Needham
|
|Cecil Moore3,25246.72%
||
|Gerald Regan3,35448.18%
|
|Buddy Daye3555.10%
|
|
||
|New riding
|-
|bgcolor=whitesmoke|Halifax-St. Margaret's
||
|D. C. McNeil5,03053.48%
|
|Alex McNeil3,91041.57%
|
|Peggy Prowse4664.95%
|
|
||
|D. C. McNeil Halifax West
|-
|bgcolor=whitesmoke|Dartmouth North
|
|Charles Clarke4,30143.62%
||
|Gordon L. S. Hart4,90649.75%
|
|Perry Ronayne6546.63%
|
|
||
|New Riding
|-
|bgcolor=whitesmoke|Dartmouth South
||
|Irvin William Akerley4,55250.37%
|
|Eileen Stubbs3,69440.88%
|
|Bruce Wallace7918.75%
|
|
||
|Irvin William Akerley Halifax County-Dartmouth
|}

Central Nova

|-
|bgcolor=whitesmoke|Antigonish 
||
|William F. MacKinnon3,22250.20%
|
|Bill Gillis3,19649.80%
|
|
|
|
||
|William F. MacKinnon
|-
|bgcolor=whitesmoke|Guysborough
||
|Alexander MacIsaac3,15452.75%
|
|Donald J. Gillis2,82547.25%
|
|
|
|
||
|Alexander MacIsaac
|-
|bgcolor=whitesmoke|Pictou Centre
||
|Donald R. MacLeod5,41653.90%
|
|John Brother MacDonald3,84638.28%
|
|John Markie7867.82%
|
|
||
|Donald R. MacLeod
|-
|bgcolor=whitesmoke|Pictou East
||
|Thomas MacQueen2,87651.14%
|
|A. Lloyd MacDonald2,74848.86%
|
|
|
|
||
|A. Lloyd MacDonald
|-
|bgcolor=whitesmoke|Pictou West
||
|Harvey Veniot3,13765.20%
|
|Edward Snow1,67434.80%
|
|
|
|
||
|Harvey Veniot
|}

Cape Breton

|-
|bgcolor=whitesmoke|Cape Breton Centre
||
|Mike Laffin3,56555.85%
|
|William J. Boudreau1,31320.57%
|
|Tom O'Leary1,50523.58%
|
|
||
|Mike Laffin
|-
|bgcolor=whitesmoke|Cape Breton East
||
|Layton Fergusson5,09453.29%
|
|William O'Leary1,41714.82%
|
|James H. Aitchison3,04831.89%
|
|
||
|Layton Fergusson
|-
|bgcolor=whitesmoke|Cape Breton North
||
|Tom MacKeough5,57453.39%
|
|Alexander O'Handley3,31831.90%
|
|Gerald Yetman1,51014.52%
|
|
||
|Tom MacKeough
|-
|bgcolor=whitesmoke|Cape Breton Nova
||
|Percy Gaum2,87347.13%
|
|Tom Miller1,82930.00%
|
|Paul MacEwan1,39422.87%
|
|
||
|Percy Gaum
|-
|bgcolor=whitesmoke|Cape Breton South
||
|Donald C. MacNeil4,84347.18%
|
|Charles O'Connell3,94438.42%
|
|Charles Palmer1,30912.75%
|
|Angus Currie1691.65%
||
|Donald C. MacNeil
|-
|bgcolor=whitesmoke|Cape Breton West
||
|Edward Manson3,86243.95%
|
|Allan Sullivan3,74842.65%
|
|Jeremy Akerman1,17813.40%
|
|
||
|Edward Manson
|-
|rowspan=2 bgcolor=whitesmoke|Inverness
||
|Norman J. MacLean3,99426.27%
|
|William MacIsaac3,57123.49%
|
|
|
|
||
|Norman J. MacLean
|-
|
|Alfred Davis3,68024.21%
||
|William N. MacLean3,95626.02%
|
|
|
|
||
|William N. MacLean
|-
|bgcolor=whitesmoke|Richmond
||
|Gerald Doucet3,05459.42%
|
|Rudolph J. Boudreau2,08640.58%
|
|
|
|
||
|Gerald Doucet
|-
|bgcolor=whitesmoke|Victoria
||
|Fisher Hudson2,03355.01%
|
|Duncan F. Buchanan1,66344.99%
|
|
|
|
||
|Carleton L. MacMillan†
|}

References

Further reading
 

1967
1967 elections in Canada
General election
May 1967 events in Canada